Roberto Carballés Baena was the defending champion but retired in the third round against Jozef Kovalík.

Salvatore Caruso won the title after defeating Kovalík 6–4, 6–2 in the final.

Seeds
All seeds receive a bye into the second round.

Draw

Finals

Top half

Section 1

Section 2

Bottom half

Section 3

Section 4

References

External links
Main draw
Qualifying draw

2019 ATP Challenger Tour